The Swan Cay Formation is a geologic formation in Panama. It preserves fossils.

Fossil content 
 Engina moinensis
 Ophidion pauxillicauda

See also 
 List of fossiliferous stratigraphic units in Panama

References

Bibliography 
 
 

Geologic formations of Panama
Pleistocene Panama
Paleontology in Panama
Sandstone formations
Reef deposits
Formations